Nejdet Zalev (born 13 July 1937) was an Olympic medalist in wrestling from the township of Ustina in south-central Bulgaria. He won the Silver Medal in freestyle wrestling (bantamweight) in the 1960 Summer Olympics in Rome.

References

1937 births
Living people
Bulgarian male sport wrestlers
Olympic medalists in wrestling
Olympic wrestlers of Bulgaria
Wrestlers at the 1960 Summer Olympics
Medalists at the 1960 Summer Olympics
Olympic silver medalists for Bulgaria
20th-century Bulgarian people
21st-century Bulgarian people